In mathematics and physics, non-Archimedean refers to something without the Archimedean property. This includes:
 Ultrametric space
 notably, p-adic numbers 
 Non-Archimedean ordered field, namely:
 Levi-Civita field
 Hyperreal numbers
 Surreal numbers
 Dehn planes
 Non-Archimedean time in theoretical physics